Slimane Ould Mata (born 8 September 1975 in Hussein Dey, Algiers) is an Algerian professional football player who currently plays as a goalkeeper for Algerian Ligue 2 club Olympique de Médéa and the Algerian national team.

Club career

Olympique de Médéa
Ould Mata signed in the summer of 2010, for Olympique de Médéa from WA Boufarik.

Statistics

International career
Ould Mata received his first call-up to the Algerian national team in April 2001, to take part in the 2002 FIFA World Cup qualifier against Senegal. This was due to his good form for his club CR Belouizdad which did not go unnoticed by the national team coaches Hamid Zouba and Kermali. Ould Mata did not take part in the game as he remained on the bench, Algeria lost the game with the final score being 3–0.

On 4 May 2001, Ould Mata made his debut for Algeria in a 2002 FIFA World Cup qualifier against Morocco, coming on as a substitute in the fifty-ninth minute for Hichem Mezaïr. He played well and did not concede any goals, but the game ended 2–1 to Morocco. Ould Matta had his first start against Angola in a 
2002 African Cup of Nations qualifier playing throughout the game helping his side beat Angola 3–2. He was then selected again for the next qualifier game against Burkina Faso again playing throughout the game conceding a goal in the thirty-ninth minute. The game ended 1–0 to Burkina Faso. Ould-Matta has not been called up by Algeria since.

References

External links
Slimane Ould Mata profile at dzfoot.com

1975 births
Living people
People from Hussein Dey (commune)
Algerian footballers
Algeria international footballers
Olympique de Médéa players
Algerian Ligue 2 players
MC Saïda players
USM El Harrach players
CR Belouizdad players
MO Béjaïa players
Algeria under-23 international footballers
Algeria youth international footballers
Association football goalkeepers
WA Boufarik players
21st-century Algerian people